Krishna Kumar Gupta is an Indian politician who is a former representative of Raigarh constituency in the Madhya Pradesh Legislative Assembly. He is the son of Bhagirathi Lal Gupta of Raigarh, Chhattisgarh. He is the ex-minister of Chhattisgarh. He was a minister for 23 years at that time and he was:- 
 Mine Minister
 Health Minister
 Education Minister
 MLA of Raigarh

References

Indian National Congress politicians
Living people
State cabinet ministers of Chhattisgarh
Year of birth missing (living people)
Madhya Pradesh MLAs 1998–2003
Chhattisgarh MLAs 2000–2003